The Ginn Open was a women's professional golf tournament on the LPGA Tour. It was played from 2006 to 2008 at Ginn Reunion Resort in Reunion, Florida.

With a purse exceeding $2 million, the tournament winner automatically qualified for the season-ending ADT Championship. 

The title sponsor was Ginn Resorts, a  resort development and management firm with headquarters in Celebration, Florida.

For all three years, the tournament was broadcast on CBS Sports.

The tournament used the front nine of the Legacy Course designed by Arnold Palmer and the front nine of the Independence Course designed by Tom Watson.

It was announced on January 28, 2009, that Ginn was ending all golf tournament sponsorships. As a result, the tournament was cancelled for 2009, and no substitute tournament was announced.

Tournament names
2006 Ginn Clubs & Resorts Open
2007-2008 Ginn Open

Winners

Tournament record

External links
Tournament results at GolfObserver.com
Official LPGA microsite

Former LPGA Tour events
Golf in Florida
Reunion, Florida
Women's sports in Florida